Krasnoborsky (masculine), Krasnoborskaya (feminine), or Krasnoborskoye (neuter) is the name of several rural localities in Russia:
Krasnoborsky, Republic of Karelia, a settlement in Pudozhsky District of the Republic of Karelia
Krasnoborsky, Leningrad Oblast, a logging depot settlement in Radogoshchinskoye Settlement Municipal Formation of Boksitogorsky District of Leningrad Oblast